Macchiarini is an Italian surname. Notable people with the surname include:

 Paolo Macchiarini (born 1958), Italian thoracic surgeon and fraudster
 Peter Macchiarini (1909–2001), Italian-American jeweler and sculptor

Italian-language surnames